Laura Wexler is Professor of American Studies, Professor of Women's, Gender, and Sexuality Studies, and co-chair of the Women's Faculty Forum at Yale University. An American feminist theorist her academic concerns are in the disciplines of women's studies and visual culture.

She completed her undergraduate studies at Sarah Lawrence College, having also attended the Massachusetts Institute of Technology where she studied photography. She holds M.A., M.Phil., and Ph.D. degrees from Columbia University in English and Comparative Literature.

Wexler is a current Fellow of the Center for the Critical Analysis of Social Difference at Columbia University, a former Fellow of the Whitney Humanities Center of Yale University. She   is a member of the Board of Trustees of the Muriel Gardiner Society for Psychoanalysis and the Humanities, and the Board of Trustees of the Joseph Slifka Center for Jewish Life at Yale.

Wexler's book Tender Violence: Domestic Visions in an Age of U. S. Imperialism (2000) was a recipient of the  American Historical Association's Joan Kelley Memorial Prize.

Books
Tender Violence: Domestic Visions in an Age of U. S. Imperialism (2000).
Pregnant Pictures (2000), with photographer Sandra Matthews.
Interpretation and the Holocaust. Wexler is co-editor, with Laura Frost, Amy Hungerford and John MacKay.

References

American women academics
Sarah Lawrence College alumni
Living people
Year of birth missing (living people)
Yale University faculty
Yale University fellows
Columbia Graduate School of Arts and Sciences alumni
Columbia University fellows
21st-century American women writers
Women's studies academics
American feminist writers